Christopher James Searle (born 23 December 1998) is an English first-class cricketer.

Searle was born at Frimley in December 1998. He was educated at Hampton School, before going up to Worcester College, Oxford to study geography. While studying at Oxford, he made his debut in first-class cricket for Oxford MCCU against Middlesex at Northwood in 2019, with Searle making a further appearance in 2019 for Oxford MCCU against Hampshire at Oxford. In addition to playing for Oxford MCCU in 2019, he also played first-class cricket for Oxford University against Cambridge University in The University Match of 2019. Searle has previously held a professional contract at Hampshire, having risen through the Hampshire Academy.

Notes

References

External links

1998 births
Living people
Cricketers from Frimley
People educated at Hampton School
Alumni of Worcester College, Oxford
English cricketers
Oxford MCCU cricketers
Oxford University cricketers